The Granite LDS Ward Chapel-Avard Fairbanks Studio is a historic building in Sandy, Utah. It was built in 1903-1905 as a meeting house for the Church of Jesus Christ of Latter-day Saints, and designed in the Romanesque Revival architectural style. It was acquired by sculptor Avard T. Fairbanks in 1966, and remodelled as his art studio. The building has been listed on the National Register of Historic Places since December 30, 2005.

References

Artists' studios in the United States
Meetinghouses of the Church of Jesus Christ of Latter-day Saints in Utah
National Register of Historic Places in Salt Lake County, Utah
Religious buildings and structures completed in 1903
Romanesque Revival architecture in Utah
1903 establishments in Utah